Any foreign national who wishes to enter Myanmar must obtain a visa unless they are a citizen of one of the designated visa-exempt countries. All visitors to Myanmar must hold a passport valid for at least 6 months.

Visa policy map

Visa exemption for normal passports

Following the COVID-19 pandemic in Myanmar and the 2021 Myanmar coup d'état, the military junta in Myanmar, known as the State Administration Council, restarted visa-free entry into Myanmar on 1 September 2022.

Nationals of  do not require a visa to enter Myanmar for tourism visits for a maximum stay of 30 days. Singaporean nationals may enter and leave Myanmar via any port of entry.

Restricted visa-free access

Nationals of the following eight countries do not require a visa to enter Myanmar for tourism visits up to the duration listed below. They must enter and leave Myanmar through either Yangon International Airport, Nay Pyi Taw International Airport or Mandalay International Airport in order to be granted visa-free entry.

1 - Temporary policy from 1 July 2022 until 30 June 2023.
2 - May also visit without a visa for business purposes.

History

They were allowed to enter by and depart from any port of entry in Myanmar.

Visa on arrival (Suspended)
The visa on arrival scheme has been suspended until further notice, according to Timatic.

Holders of normal passports issued by the following countries who are travelling as tourists would have been able to obtain a visa on arrival at Yangon International Airport, Nay Pyi Taw International Airport or Mandalay International Airport valid for up to 30 days. They would have to pay a fee of US$50 to obtain the visa.

eVisa 
Myanmar launched an eVisa system on 1 September 2014. eVisas are issued online for tourism and business purposes only. An evisa is issued within 3 working days, is valid for 90 days from the date of issue and allows a maximum stay of up to 28 days (for tourists) or 70 days (for business travellers with an invitation). The fee for a business eVisa is US$70, while a tourist eVisa costs US$50. Visas are issued free of charge to children under 7.

The list of eligible countries was expanded twice, first in October 2014, then in January 2015. In July 2015, the business eVisa was introduced.

Holders of eVisas must enter from one of the following ports of entry:
Yangon International Airport
Nay Pyi Taw International Airport
Mandalay International Airport
Kawthaung Land Border Checkpoint with Thailand
Myawaddy Land Border Checkpoint with Thailand
Tachileik Land Border Checkpoint with Thailand
Rihkhawdar Land Border Checkpoint with India
Tamu Land Border Checkpoint with India

Nationals of the following countries are eligible:

Note:
1 - Countries eligible for business/tourist e-visa along with visa-free or visa on arrival privilege.
2 - Countries eligible for business/tourist e-visa.
3 - Jurisdictions eligible for business e-visa only.
# - British citizens are eligible for business/tourist e-visa. All other classes of British nationality are eligible for tourist e-visa only.
No mark - Countries eligible for tourist e-visa only.

The eVisa system may be extended to other nationalities and ports of entry in the future and may include the issuance of other types of visas.

Non-ordinary passports
Holders of diplomatic and official/service passports of the following countries do not require a visa for Myanmar: 
90 days
Bangladesh, Colombia, India, Israel, Japan (diplomatic passport only), South Korea, Morocco, Nepal, Russia, Serbia

30 days 
Belarus, Brazil, Cambodia, China, North Korea, Laos, Malaysia, Mongolia, Philippines, Sri Lanka, Thailand, Vietnam

Other arrangements
A visa on arrival for business purposes is available for citizens from 52 countries/territories flying into Yangon International Airport, Naypyidaw Airport or Mandalay International Airport using the application form and with company registration and invitation documents.
	
Myanmar Airways claims that nationals of all countries and jurisdictions may obtain a tourist visa on arrival valid for 28 days provided they are arriving at Yangon International Airport on a specific flight on Myanmar Airways International from Guangzhou, though this seems to conflict with the Myanmar Visa on Arrival requirements.

In August 2017 an expansion of the visa on arrival system was announced. In October 2018 an expansion of the visa-free system was announced for early 2019.

Statistics
Most visitors arriving to Myanmar on short term basis were from the following countries of nationality:

See also

 Visa requirements for Myanmar citizens
 Foreign relations of Myanmar

References

External links 
Myanmar eVisa, Ministry of Immigration and Population

Myanmar
Foreign relations of Myanmar